Kristian Albert Christiansen (1 January 1888 – 10 October 1966) was a Norwegian politician.

He was born in Larvik to saw mill worker Olaus Christiansen and Anne Helene Andersen. He was elected representative to the Storting for the periods 1928–1930, 1934–1936 and 1937–1945, for the Labour Party.

References

1888 births
1966 deaths
People from Larvik
Labour Party (Norway) politicians
Members of the Storting